Fautrix candida is a species of sea snail, a marine gastropod mollusk in the family Calliostomatidae. Fautrix candida was identified by Dr. Bruce Marshall in 2007.

Description
Fautrix candida grows to a maximum height of 14 millimetres and a maximum width of 13 millimetres.

Distribution
Fautrix candida is endemic to the areas of Wanganella Bank on the south side of Norfolk Ridge at a depth of up to 356 metres, as well as around Three Kings Islands at depths between 200 and 805 metres and off the coast of southern New Caledonia at depths between 470 and 550 metres.

References

 Marshall, B.A. (1995). Calliostomatidae (Gastropoda: Trochoidea) from New Caledonia, the Loyalty Islands and the northern Lord Howe Rise. pp. 381–458 in Bouchet, P. (ed.). Résultats des Campagnes MUSORSTOM, Vol. 14 . Mém. Mus. nat. Hist. nat. 167 : 381-458

External links

candida
Gastropods described in 1995